Matej Gnezda (born 12 January 1979) is a Slovenian former professional racing cyclist.

Major results
2006
3rd Time trial, National Road Championships
2007
1st Belgrade–Banja Luka I
3rd Road race, National Road Championships
2008
2nd Belgrade–Banja Luka II
2010
1st Poreč Trophy
1st GP Kranj
2nd Road race, National Road Championships
2nd Trofeo Zsšdi
2012
2nd Poreč Trophy

References

External links

1979 births
Living people
Slovenian male cyclists